Milton Learmonth McIntyre (23 October 1909 – 26 May 1969) was an Australian rules footballer who played with Footscray in the Victorian Football League (VFL).

Notes

External links 

1909 births
1969 deaths
Australian rules footballers from Victoria (Australia)
Western Bulldogs players